The 2019–20 season is Dinamo Sassari's 60th in existence and the club's 10th consecutive season in the top flight of Italian basketball.

Overview 
Sassari comes from a very successful 2018-19 season both in the Italian league and European league. They won, indeed, the FIBA Europe Cup and for the first time of the history of the club, Sassari added a European level trophy in their palmares.

In Italy, Sassari reached the finals and lost the series at the last best of 4 match, interrupting an incredible series of 15 consecutive wins in the Italian league.

Coach Gianmarco Pozzecco was hired during the 2018-19 season and, since his establishment, he lost only four games in the finals against Reyer Venezia after winning 23 consecutive games amongst Europe Cup and Serie A.

He got his contract extended for the next three years  and immediately won the 2019 Italian Basketball Supercup in the new season.

The 2019-20 season was hit by the coronavirus pandemic that compelled the federation to suspend and later cancel the competition without assigning the title to anyone. Sassari ended the championship in 2nd position.

Kit 
Supplier: EYE Sport Wear / Sponsor: Banco di Sardegna

Lega Basket Serie A

FIBA Basketball Champions League

Players 
Before the early end of the season Sassari hired Jaime Smith who played for the team the previous year. During his presentation conference, on 3rd of March, coach Pozzecco declared that Curtis Jerrells wouldn't play anymore for the team but he was never officially released.

Current roster

Depth chart

Squad changes

In

|}

Out

|}

Confirmed 

|}

Coach

Competitions

SuperCup 

Sassari took part in the 25th edition of the Italian Basketball Supercup as the 2019 LBA Finals runner-up and won the competition against Reyer Venezia.

Serie A

Basketball Champions League 

After the successes of the previous year, Dinamo Sassari was promoted to the 2019–20 Basketball Champions League as winner of the FIBA Europe Cup.

Regular season

Playoffs 
The 2019–20 Basketball Champions League playoffs start from the round of 16 and is structured on a best-of-three basis until the final four.

Round of 16 

The second match was played behind closed doors due to the coronavirus pandemic, where Sassari was coming after two days without training.

Italian Cup 
Sassari qualified to the 2020 Italian Basketball Cup having ended the first half of the season in 2nd place. They lost the first match in the quarter finals against Happy Casa Brindisi.

References 

2019–20 in Italian basketball by club
2019–20 Basketball Champions League